Ceratodus  is a rural town and locality in the North Burnett Region, Queensland, Australia. In the  the locality of Ceratodus had a population of 28 people.

Geography 
The river flows from north-east to south-west, where it is joined by the Nogo River. The Burnett Highway passes through from south to north.

History
The town takes its name from the railway station, which in turn was named on 4 October 1923 from the Queensland lungfish, Neoceratodus forsteri, originally only found in the Burnett River and the Mary River.

A railway station on the Mungar Junction to Monto railway line opened here 26 April 1924. On 12 September 1924, the District Postal Inspector, Maryborough Division, reported that 100 railway employees were camped at Ceratodus, engaged on bridge building and other railway work, and that there was one permanent settler (named Falconer) in the locality.

Ceratodus Provisional School was open from 1925 to 1927. Ceratodus State School opened in July 1930 and closed on 10 October 1965.

A receiving office opened at the railway station in January 1925 and was elevated to a post office by April 1926.
The settlement was, for many years, a watering station for steam locomotives. In 1967 it was reported that the postmistress and station-mistress (Mrs J. Leard) also operated the telephone exchange (to which only one subscriber's service was connected) and that there were no shops or businesses in the settlement, only two railway cottages. The post office closed 31 May 1968.

In the  the locality of Ceratodus had a population of 28 people.

Heritage listings 
Ceratodus has a number of heritage-listed sites, including:

 Burnett Highway: Ceratodus Rest Area

References

Further reading

External links
 

Towns in Queensland
North Burnett Region
Localities in Queensland